"Soldier's Joy" is a fiddle tune, classified as a reel or country dance. It is popular in the American fiddle canon, in which it is touted as "an American classic" but traces its origin to Scottish fiddling traditions. It has been played in Scotland for over 200 years, and Robert Burns used it for the first song of his cantata 'The Jolly Beggars'. According to documentation at the United States Library of Congress, it is "one of the oldest and most widely distributed tunes" and is rated in the top ten most-played old time fiddle tunes. The tune dates as early as the 1760s. In spite of its upbeat tempo and catchy melody, the term "soldier's joy" has a much darker meaning than is portrayed by the tune. This term eventually came to refer to the combination of whiskey, beer, and morphine used by American Civil War soldiers to alleviate pain.

Score

Melody as basis for song
Like many pure tunes with ancient pedigree, the melody of Soldier's Joy has been used as a basis for construction of songs, which, unlike pure tunes, have lyrics. Robert Burns wrote lyrics for the tune in which a dismembered, homeless veteran sarcastically recounts his delight with battle.

Civil War era and post-bellum cultural references
The tune came to represent substance use to alleviate pain during the Civil War. This is corroborated in concurring secondary sources.

The IHIC version is as follows:

Country

See also
 Old-time music
 Skillet Lickers
 Banjo
 Appalachian music
 Sam Stone (song)

References

External links
 Jeff Todd Titon's Old-Time Kentucky Fiddle Tunes (University of Kentucky Press)
 Digital Library of Appalachia provides online access to archival and historical materials related to the culture of the southern and central Appalachian region. The contents of the DLA are drawn from special collections of Appalachian College Association member libraries.
 1929 Skillet Lickers film clip with commentary
 Henry Reed Library of Congress mp3
 

Bluegrass songs
American folk songs
Songs about the military
Songs about alcohol
Songs about soldiers
Performing arts pages with videographic documentation
Old-time music
Songs with lyrics by Robert Burns